Wavertree Technology Park is a technology park in the Wavertree area of Liverpool, England between the city centre and the M62 motorway. It comprises single storey parades of pavilion-style office units.

The park is served by Wavertree Technology Park railway station, which opened in 2000.

References

Buildings and structures in Liverpool
Science parks in the United Kingdom